The 1840 Connecticut gubernatorial election was held on April 6, 1840. It was a rematch of the 1839 Connecticut gubernatorial election. Incumbent governor and Whig nominee William W. Ellsworth was re-elected, defeating former senator and Democratic nominee John M. Niles with 54.17% of the vote.

After his loss, Niles would be appointed Postmaster General by President Martin Van Buren, serving from May 19, 1840, until the end of Van Buren's term, March 4, 1841.

General election

Candidates
Major party candidates

William W. Ellsworth, Whig
John M. Niles, Democratic

Results

References

1840
Connecticut
Gubernatorial